Upton Noble is a village and civil parish on the River Frome.

There was a 17th-century village pub called The Lamb Inn (now closed), a village hall, a primary school, a church, a post office and a garage.

History

The parish was also known as Upton Caboche in the 14th century.

The first part of the name means the upper settlement, the second part is from the family of Sir John le Noble who held the manor in the 13th century.

Governance

The parish council has responsibility for local issues, including setting an annual precept (local rate) to cover the council's operating costs and producing annual accounts for public scrutiny. The parish council evaluates local planning applications and works with the local police, district council officers, and neighbourhood watch groups on matters of crime, security, and traffic. The parish council's role also includes initiating projects for the maintenance and repair of parish facilities, as well as consulting with the district council on the maintenance, repair, and improvement of highways, drainage, footpaths, public transport, and street cleaning. Conservation matters (including trees and listed buildings) and environmental issues are also the responsibility of the council.

The village falls within the Non-metropolitan district of Mendip, which was formed on 1 April 1974 under the Local Government Act 1972, having previously been part of Frome Rural District, which is responsible for local planning and building control, local roads, council housing, environmental health, markets and fairs, refuse collection and recycling, cemeteries and crematoria, leisure services, parks, and tourism.

Somerset County Council is responsible for running the largest and most expensive local services such as education, social services, libraries, main roads, public transport, policing and  fire services, trading standards, waste disposal and strategic planning.

It is also part of the Somerton and Frome (UK Parliament constituency) county constituency represented in the House of Commons of the Parliament of the United Kingdom. It elects one Member of Parliament (MP) by the first past the post system of election.

Religious sites

The Church of St Mary Magdalene dates from the 12th century and is a Grade II* listed building. The church was a chapelry to Batcombe.

School
Upton Noble C of E VC Primary School celebrated its 50-year anniversary in 2015. It received 'Good’ inspection in its 2019 Ofsted report.

Events
The Upton Noble Beer & Cider Festival has been held each September since 2014, with around 1,000 people attending the event in 2017.

Upton Noble has a calendar of events throughout the year and you can hire the village hall for your own activities.

References

External links

Villages in Mendip District
Civil parishes in Somerset